Psychotria grandiflora, the largeflower wild coffee, large-flowered balsamo or kopiko, is a species of plant in the family Rubiaceae endemic to the island of Kauai in the Hawaiian Islands. It grows in rainforest habitat. There are ten small populations remaining, with a total of no more than 30 individuals. This plant was federally listed as an endangered species of the United States in 2010.

References

Endemic flora of Hawaii
Trees of Hawaii
grandiflora
Critically endangered flora of the United States
Taxonomy articles created by Polbot